Bangladesh International School Dammam is an international school located in Dammam, Eastern Province, Saudi Arabia.

Establishment 

The school was established on January 1, 1987. H. E. Hedayet Ahmed, then Ambassador of Bangladesh, who proposed the school as a part of the education and cultural wing of the Bangladesh Embassy in Saudi Arabia. The school is run by a school management committee, which is elected by the school parents. The school has nearly 1,400 students from Bangladesh, India, Sri Lanka, Egypt, Eritrea, Ethiopia, Pakistan, Sudan and other countries.

The school has two sections:
 The school section - Grade KG to Grade X
 The college section - Grade XI to Grade XII

Curriculum 
BISD follows the University of Cambridge Local Examination Syndicate for its course structure. Students appear for their 'IGCSE' level examination after completing Grade X, and their 'AS & A' level examination after completing Grade XI and XII, respectively. Both of the examinations take place with the supervision of the British Council in the Eastern Province. The school has 33 male teachers and 51 female teachers who come from countries like Bangladesh, India, Pakistan, Sri Lanka, and Nigeria. The main language of the school is English but Bengali and Arabic are also taught as compulsory subjects till grade 8.

Online campus 

The school executives launched a web portal to help the students get lecture notes, worksheets, and other necessary academic materials. It is also possible to see the examination marks and the report cards of the students. The system is managed by the system's admin, Mr. Imran. The web portal was published along with a new website in 2016.

Hosting of Cambridge International Examinations
Bangladesh International School Dammam has been hosting IGCSE and AS/A Level Cambridge International Examinations and has been a Cambridge Affiliate school since 2015. It is an official IELTS test and training center and also hosts Cambridge primary and upper secondary checkpoint exams.

Achievements

Inter-school achievements 
In 2016, BISD participated in the Interschool Speech Competition along with Inspire Academy, Manarat, and other Dammam-based schools. BISD took second placed, which was secured by a Grade IX pupil.

IGCSE exams 
At the 2006 British Council annual awards ceremony, Muhammad Ehsanul Hoque was honored for achieving first place in mathematics and economics at A Level. Akil Muhammad Habibullah was ranked first in chemistry at O Level.

At the graduation ceremony in May 2007, Arab News announced in 2006 the school had a 100 percent success rate for students in their final examinations.

In 2011, Fahim Abdullah, who had been a pupil at the school since 2000, got top marks in the IGCSE and GCE A Levels and received three awards: Top in the World in Additional Mathematics and Mathematics (without coursework), and Top in Dammam in Physics in International General Certificate of Secondary Education examination.

Maleeha Choudhury, who had been a pupil since 1998, also achieved Best Across Four Cambridge A Levels, and Top in Saudi Arabia in Chemistry. She is currently a student of Medicine at Batterjee Medical College in Jeddah.

In 2018, Abdullah bin Joynal, got Top in the world for General Mathematics in IGCSE. As a result, he received a free scholarship from the school.

Notable alumni 
Elita Karim, singer, journalist, performer, anchor and voice artist.

References

External links 

 
 

Educational institutions established in 1997
Bangladeshi international schools in Saudi Arabia
Cambridge schools in Saudi Arabia
Education in Dammam
1997 establishments in Saudi Arabia